The Tender Trap may refer to:

The Tender Trap (play), a 1954 Broadway play
The Tender Trap (film), a 1955 movie based on the play, starring Debbie Reynolds and Frank Sinatra
The Tender Trap (club), a cabaret nightclub
"(Love Is) The Tender Trap", a song written for the movie, popularized by Frank Sinatra
The Tender Trap (album), a 1998 Stacey Kent album
Tender Trap, a UK indie rock/twee pop band